The United States House of Representatives elections in California, 1875 were elections for California's delegation to the United States House of Representatives, which occurred on September 7, 1875. Democrats gained two districts.

Results
Final results from the Clerk of the House of Representatives:

District 1

District 2

District 3

District 4

See also
44th United States Congress
Political party strength in California
Political party strength in U.S. states
United States House of Representatives elections, 1874

References
California Elections Page
Office of the Clerk of the House of Representatives

External links
California Legislative District Maps (1911-Present)
RAND California Election Returns: District Definitions

1875
California United States House of Representatives
1875 California elections